Harland is both a surname and a given name. The name Harland is of Anglo-Saxon origins. It can be traced back to the Midlands as one of the earliest recorded surnames in the United Kingdom. Notable people with the name include:

Surname
Albert Harland, British politician
Bryce Harland, New Zealand diplomat
David M. Harland, author
Edward James Harland, co-founder of Harland and Wolff shipbuilders
Georgina Harland, Olympic athlete
Henry Harland, novelist and editor
James Penrose Harland, archaeologist
Kurt Harland, singer and composer
Louisa Harland, Irish actress
Marion Harland, pen name of Mary Terhune
Maurice Harland, 20th century Anglican bishop
Paul Harland, Dutch science fiction writer
Robert Harland, actor
Sydney Harland, British botanist
W. Brian Harland, geologist

Given name
Harland Ah You, American football player
Harland Bartholomew, American civil engineer and urban planner 
Harland Epps, American astronomer 
Harland Gunn, American football player  
Harland Bradley Howe, American judge 
Colonel Harland Sanders, founder of KFC and philanthropist 
Harland Svare (1930–2020), American football player, coach and executive 
Harland Williams, comedian, actor, and radio personality

See also
 Harland (disambiguation)
 Harlan, given name and surname